This is a list of properties and historic districts in Tennessee that are listed on the National Register of Historic Places. There are over 2,000 in total. Of these, 29 are National Historic Landmarks. Each of Tennessee's 95 counties has at least one listing.

The Tennessee Historical Commission, which manages the state's participation in the National Register program, reports that 80 percent of the state's area has been surveyed for historic buildings. Surveys for archaeological sites have been less extensive; coverage is estimated less than 5 percent of the state. Not all properties that have been determined to be eligible for National Register are listed.

The locations of National Register properties and districts (at least for all showing latitude and longitude coordinates below), may be seen in an online map by clicking on "Map of all coordinates".



Current listings by county
The following are approximate tallies of current listings by county. These counts are based on entries in the National Register Information Database as of April 24, 2008 and new weekly listings posted since then on the National Register of Historic Places web site. There are frequent additions to the listings and occasional delistings and the counts here are approximate and not official. New entries are added to the official Register on a weekly basis.  Also, the counts in this table exclude boundary increase and decrease listings which only modify the area covered by an existing property or district, although carrying a separate National Register reference number.

The Tennessee county with the largest number of National Register listings is Davidson County, site of the state capital, Nashville.

Anderson County

Bedford County

Benton County

|}

Former listings

|}

Bledsoe County

|}

Blount County

Bradley County

Campbell County

|}

Cannon County

|}

Carroll County

|}

Former listing

|}

Carter County

Cheatham County

|}

Chester County

|}

Claiborne County

Clay County

|}

Cocke County

Coffee County

Crockett County

|}

Cumberland County

|}

Davidson County

DeKalb County

|}

Former listing

|}

Decatur County

|}

Dickson County

Dyer County

|}

Former listing

|}

Fayette County

Fentress County

Franklin County

Gibson County

Giles County

Grainger County

Greene County

Grundy County

Hamblen County

Hamilton County

Hancock County

|}

Hardeman County

Hardin County

|}

Hawkins County

Haywood County

Henderson County

|}

Henry County

Hickman County

Houston County

|}

Humphreys County

Jackson County

|}

Jefferson County

Johnson County

|}

Former listing

|}

Knox County

Lake County

|}

Lauderdale County

|}

Lawrence County

Lewis County

|}

Lincoln County

Loudon County

Macon County

|}

Former listings

|}

Madison County

Marion County

Marshall County

Maury County

McMinn County

McNairy County

|}

Meigs County

Monroe County

Montgomery County

Moore County

|}

Morgan County

|}

Obion County

Overton County

|}

Perry County

|}

Pickett County

|}

Polk County

Putnam County

Rhea County

|}

Roane County

Robertson County

Rutherford County

Scott County

|}

Former listings

|}

Sequatchie County

|}

Sevier County

Shelby County

Smith County

Stewart County

Sullivan County

Sumner County

Tipton County

Trousdale County

|}

Unicoi County

|}

Union County

|}

Van Buren County

|}

Warren County

Washington County

Wayne County

|}

Weakley County

White County

Williamson County

Wilson County

See also

 List of National Historic Landmarks in Tennessee

References

 
Tennessee